San Secondo di Pinerolo (Piedmontese: San Second; , French: Saint-Second-de-Pignerol) is a comune (municipality) in the Metropolitan City of Turin in the Italian region Piedmont, located about  southwest of Turin.

San Secondo di Pinerolo borders the following municipalities: Pinerolo, San Germano Chisone, Porte, Prarostino, Osasco, and Bricherasio. The main sight is the Castle of Miradolo, a neo-Gothic villa near the Chisone stream.

Twin towns
 Carlos Pellegrini, Argentina

References

External links
 Official website 

Cities and towns in Piedmont